Crab Lake is an unorganized territory in Saint Louis County, Minnesota, United States, located north of Eagles Nest Township, and west of Morse Township. The population was 11 at the 2000 census.

Geography
According to the United States Census Bureau, the unorganized territory has a total area of 36.7 square miles (95.1 km2), of which 33.6 square miles (87.1 km2) is land and 3.1 square miles (8.0 km2) (8.39%) is water.

Demographics
At the 2000 census there were 11 people, 4 households, and 3 families living in the unorganized territory. The population density was 0.3 people per square mile (0.1/km2). There were 10 housing units at an average density of 0.3/sq mi (0.1/km2).  The racial makeup of the unorganized territory was 100.00% White.
Of the 4 households 50.0% had children under the age of 18 living with them, 75.0% were married couples living together, and 25.0% were non-families. 25.0% of households were one person and none had someone living alone who was 65 or older. The average household size was 2.75 and the average family size was 3.33.

The age distribution was 27.3% under the age of 18, 9.1% from 18 to 24, 27.3% from 25 to 44, 27.3% from 45 to 64, and 9.1% 65 or older. The median age was 36 years. For every 100 females, there were 57.1 males. For every 100 females age 18 and over, there were 60.0 males.

The median household income was $53,750 and the median family income  was $53,750. Males had a median income of $0 versus $0 for females. The per capita income for the unorganized territory was $28,200. None of the population or the families were below the poverty line.

References

Populated places in St. Louis County, Minnesota
Unorganized territories in Minnesota